Naci Ağbal (born 1 January 1968) is a Turkish politician and former civil servant from the Justice and Development Party (AKP) who served as the Minister of Finance between 2015 and 2018. He was a Member of Parliament for the electoral district of Bayburt, a position he held until 2018 after being elected during the June 2015 general election. He previously served as the Undersecretary to the Ministry of Finance between 2009 and 2015, resigning in order to contest the election.

Early life and career
Naci Ağbal was born on 1 January 1968 in Bayburt and graduated from Istanbul University Faculty of Political Education in 1989. He began his career in the same year by entering the Inspection Board, later becoming a Finance Inspector in 1993. In 2003, he became a department manager at the General Directorate of Revenues and later became the General Director of Budget and Financial Control in 2007. In October 2008, he was elected by the Cabinet of Turkey to the Council of Higher Education (YÖK), having been an Ahmet Yesevi University Board of Trustees member since 8 March 2008. On 12 June 2009, he became the Undersecretary to the Ministry of Finance.

Political career
Ağbal was one of the 200 bureaucrats who resigned from their civil service positions in February 2015 in order to stand as candidates in the June 2015 general election. He was put forward as a Justice and Development Party (AKP) candidate for his hometown of Bayburt and was subsequently elected to Parliament. He was re-elected in the November 2015 general election.

Minister of Finance
After the AKP won a parliamentary majority in the November 2015 election, Prime Minister Ahmet Davutoğlu appointed Ağbal as Finance Minister in his new government on 24 November 2015. Ağbal replaced Mehmet Şimşek, who was appointed as a Deputy Prime Minister of Turkey having served as Finance Minister since 2009. In his first statement since being appointed as Minister, Ağbal claimed that the Turkish economy was entering a new 'reform' period and that the government would never stray from the principles of financial discipline. He stressed the need for creating a strong financial infrastructure in order to advance economic growth. Outgoing Finance Minister Mehmet Şimşek praised his successor for his previous work as Undersecretary, with both committing their economic program to one of fiscal conservatism during their terms in government.

Governor of the Turkish Central Bank 
On 7 November 2020, he was appointed the Governor of the Central Bank of Turkey, replacing , who was unable to stop the fall of the Turkish lira, which had lost more than 40% against the Dollar since January 2020. He was sacked by Recep Tayyip Erdoğan on 20 March 2021.

See also
List of Turkish civil servants

References

External links
MP profile on the Grand National Assembly website
Collection of all relevant news items at Haberler.com

1968 births
Deputies of Bayburt
Istanbul University alumni
Justice and Development Party (Turkey) politicians
Living people
Members of the 25th Parliament of Turkey
Members of the 26th Parliament of Turkey
Members of the 64th government of Turkey
Members of the 65th government of Turkey
Ministers of Finance of Turkey
People from Bayburt
Turkish civil servants
Governors of the Central Bank of Turkey